Blackburn Rovers F.C. Academy and Under-23s are the youth teams of Blackburn Rovers. The Blackburn Rovers Academy holds Category One status. The current manager of the Under 23's side is Billy Barr, who was appointed following Damien Johnson's promotion to First Team Technical Football Director. Billy Barr has managed several youth sides at Blackburn, including most recently the Under 18's, and many of the players now playing under him at 23's level have played for him for many years. The team play in the Premier League 2 Division 1, after gaining promotion from the Premier League 2 Division 2 in the 2017/18 season.

Under-23s team
Blackburn Rovers Under-23s play in the Premier League 2 Division 1.

Damien Johnson is the former manager the Under-23. His predecessor, Eric Kinder left the role to take over as the club's Head of Academy. Kinder was appointed Gary Bowyer's replacement following his appointment as first team manager following two successful caretaker spells. However, the new current head of Academy at Blackburn Rovers is Stuart Jones. The Under 23s play their home games at The Lancashire FA County Ground at Leyland, Preston.

The team now is mainly consistent of players poached from local academies like Manchester United, Manchester City, Liverpool and Everton. Several Under 23's players have recently made the step up into Tony Mowbray's first team, including Lewis Travis, John Buckley, Joe Rankin-Costello and Joe Grayson (son of former Blackburn player - now Blackpool manager Simon Grayson).

The Academy
Blackburn Rovers Academy holds Category One status, the highest possible. The club maintained this status in a full audit which took place during the 2017/18 season. The Academy trains at Brockhall training village, the same location as the first team and the Under 23s. It also provides a stepping stone for youngsters to progress to the highest levels of football at Blackburn Rovers producing high quality players in the past. Former players such as Damien Duff, Phil Jones, Damien Johnson, James Beattie, Neil Danns, Jonathan Walters, and Anthony Pilkington were all nurtured in The Academy. Current professional football players also include Jason Lowe, Martin Olsson, Grant Hanley, Josh Morris, Adam Henley, Connor Mahoney and Jack O'Connell. Recent graduates such as Lewis Travis, Ryan Nyambe and David Raya all play for or played for Blackburn Rovers first team in the Championship today.

History & Facilities
In January 1991, British industrialist and businessman Jack Walker a lifelong fan of Blackburn Rovers completed the takeover of the club. In the following years, the Brockhall Village Academy, was constructed at a cost of approximately £4.75 million. The centre included state of the art facilities on a par with top training facilities elsewhere in Europe. It includes 6 full-size pitches, indoor training facilities, an indoor running track, outdoor running "hill", a swimming pool, goalkeeper training facilities as well as accommodation for the youth players.

Blackburn Rovers India Academy
On 19 November 2010, Pune based chicken meat processing, and pharmaceutical company, Venkateshwara Hatcheries Private Limited., completed the takeover of Blackburn Rovers, under the name Venky's London Limited.

One of the companies early ambitions was to open an Academy back in their home nation of India. Managing director, told The Indian Express newspaper the club was planning a centre of excellence near Pune which is 100 km (60 miles) from Mumbai.

"We are getting an academy and a stadium in Pune," Venky's B. Balaji Rao was quoted as saying. "The site is near the Mumbai-Pune highway and will be ready in a year-and-a-half or two years." Rao said the academy, on the outskirts of the city, will be run exactly like a Rovers' training centre at Brockhall in northwest England, taking players from the age of 11 and 12. As of 2016 however no academy or stadium has been constructed.

Squads

Development Squad

Academy (Under-18s)
Updated 9 August 2022.

Noted graduates

Blackburn Rovers' youth system has been successful over the years, many players who have come through it have gone on to feature in the first-team and make an impact or progress in the 1st teams of other clubs in the future.

Current/Former Rovers first teamers

Other notable academy graduates

References

External links
Blackburn Rovers FC Official Website

Reserves and Academy
Football academies in England
Lancashire League (football)
West Lancashire Football League
Premier League International Cup